Evani Silinzi Esperance (born 30 November 1990) is a Surinamese professional footballer who plays as a striker for SVB Eerste Divisie club Bintang Lahir.

International career 
Esperance represented the Suriname national under-17 team during the 2007 CONCACAF U17 Tournament qualification. He played for the senior team from 2011 to 2016, and would go on to score 2 goals in 16 matches.

International goals 

 Suriname score listed first, score column indicates score after each Esperance goal.

References

External links
 

1990 births
Living people
Surinamese footballers
Suriname international footballers
Suriname youth international footballers
Association football forwards
SVB Eerste Divisie players
People from Coronie District
S.V. Voorwaarts players
S.V. Botopasi players
S.C.V. Bintang Lahir players